<noinclude>

The International Legion of Territorial Defence of Ukraine, or the Ukrainian Foreign Legion, is a foreign military unit of the Territorial Defense Forces of Ukraine. It was created on 27 February 2022 by the Ukrainian government at the request of President Volodymyr Zelenskyy to fight against the Russian invasion of the country. In establishing the force, Ukraine joined more than 90 other nations that have recruited legionnaires and raised foreign legions over the past two centuries.

Ukrainian Foreign Minister Dmytro Kuleba claimed that by 6 March 2022 more than 20,000 volunteers from 52 countries had enlisted to fight for Ukraine; several thousand more reportedly joined after the announcement. Kuleba withheld further demographic details, because several nations forbid their citizens from fighting for foreign governments.

As of November 2022, volunteers from the legion were recruited from 60 countries.

History

Formation of the unit
Under the order by President Volodymyr Zelenskyy, the unit was created to join the defence against the 2022 Russian invasion of Ukraine, and its formation was announced in a statement by the Ukrainian Foreign Minister Dmytro Kuleba on 27 February, three days after the invasion began. Kuleba promoted the unit on Twitter, inviting individuals to apply and stating that "together we defeated Hitler, and we will defeat Putin too."  On 7 March, the Ukrainian Armed Forces released the first image of International Legion soldiers in trenches on the outskirts of Kyiv and announced that new groups were being deployed to the front each day.

Some foreign volunteers came to Ukraine much earlier, in 2014, to join the fight against the pro-Russian separatists as members of Ukrainian volunteer battalions that have been created after the start of the War in the Donbas. Most foreign fighters arrived throughout the summer of 2014 and on 6 October 2014 the Ukrainian parliament voted to allow foreign fighters to join the Ukrainian military.

While these units have officially been integrated into the Ukrainian Armed Forces, some units such as the Georgian Legion still exercise some autonomy. Prior to the formation of the International Legion, the Georgian Legion was used to train English-speaking foreign volunteers. Kacper Rękawek, a researcher on foreign fighters in Ukraine, believes the majority of Western fighters prior to the 2022 Russian invasion of Ukraine passed through the Georgian Legion. Other foreign volunteer battalions in the Ukrainian military included the Dzhokhar Dudayev Battalion and Sheikh Mansur Battalion—both formed by anti-Russian and anti-Ramzan Kadyrov Chechens, and the Tactical group "Belarus" (formed by anti-Lukashenko Belarusians).

While Rękawek said that some foreign fighters that traveled to Ukraine in 2014 held extremist political beliefs and supported the Azov Battalion or the Russian separatist forces in Donbas, the foreign fighters travelling to Ukraine in early 2022 "don't appear to be motivated, as a group, by a certain set of ideological tropes." He also said the mobilization of foreign fighters in 2022 is much larger than the mobilization in 2014. According to Rękawek, the formation of the International Legion was "an attempt to internationalize the conflict via mobilization of Western individuals for the Ukrainian cause. This development would also assist in embarrassing the Western governments, who in the eyes of many Ukrainians are not doing enough to support Kyiv."

Historical comparisons 

Many commentators have compared the International Legion to the International Brigades of the Spanish Civil War, which comprised foreign volunteers who supported the Second Spanish Republic against the Nationalist faction led by fascist general Francisco Franco that sought to overthrow the Republic.

Other commentators have criticized this comparison. Sebastiaan Faber of Oberlin College in the US argued that depicting the Legion as part of a war between fascism and anti-fascism risks playing "into the Kremlin's narrative, which seeks to portray the "special military operation" as an effort to "denazify" its western neighbor." Critics have also highlighted differences in the makeup of the two international units: Volunteers to Spain generally lacked military experience, while those to Ukraine tend to have prior military experience. Moreover, the Brigades were organised by the Communist International, and thus mostly comprised communists with backgrounds in labour movements, whereas the Ukrainian Legion is composed of volunteers from a broader spectrum of ideologies.

Elizabeth Grasmeder of Duke University has compared Ukraine's foreign legion to Finland's efforts to recruit legionnaires and other foreign volunteers during the Winter War (1939-1940). Grasmeder argues states are likely to recruit foreign volunteers when fighting wars of "national survival" against another state attempting to annex their territory. Ukraine's conflict with Russia is an interstate conflict of "national survival" against annexation, as was Finland's with the Soviet Union.

Recruitment and selection 
Candidates are advised to contact the Defense Attaché of the Ukrainian embassy in their respective country.

The criteria listed for joining included having prior military or medical experience and submitting documents as proof of military service to the Ministry of Defense official at the Ukrainian embassy. People were asked not to bring their own weapons to Ukraine. Most of the volunteers who reached Lviv and applied were accepted.

The First Deputy Interior Minister of Ukraine, Yevhen Yenin, announced in March 2022 that volunteers to the International Legion would be eligible for Ukrainian citizenship, if desired. The necessary probation period is the duration of the war.

A British volunteer said that the contract required to join the International Legion limits pay to ₴7,000 a month (US$230) and extends for the duration of the war, although some volunteers were allowed to leave after signing.

It has been reported that initial training and selection of volunteers had led to "uneven" performance and that the initial intake had already been dismissed by the Ukrainian authorities, with one anonymous Ukrainian general stating "we should only take experienced combat veterans — that is the lesson that we are learning... the others don't know what they are getting themselves into – and when they find out, they want to go home".

Strength and organization 
Kacper Rękawek, a researcher on foreign fighters in Ukraine, stressed the large number of volunteers announced by Ukraine were "people who applied, who got in touch with the Ukrainian Embassy" and not necessarily the number of foreign fighters in Ukraine.

On 3 March 2022, Zelenskyy announced 16,000 foreign volunteers had attempted to join the International Legion.

On 7 March 2022, Ukrainian Foreign Minister Dmytro Kuleba stated that more than 20,000 volunteers from 52 countries have volunteered to fight for Ukraine. He did not mention the home countries of the volunteers, saying that some of the countries forbid their citizens from fighting for other countries. He also did not specify how many of the foreign volunteers have arrived in Ukraine.

Recruits with past military experience have described the legion as insufficiently officered, leading to unnecessary casualties.

Government acknowledgment of nationals serving in the International Legion 
In early March 2022, a French government adviser confirmed a dozen French nationals were in Ukraine and had likely joined the International Legion.

The first photo distributed by the Ukrainian armed forces of the International Legion included members from the United Kingdom, Mexico, the United States, India, Sweden, and Lithuania. The Ukrainian Ministry of Foreign Affairs has confirmed the identity and background of a Belgian and Finnish volunteer through video interviews on their Twitter.

On 9 March 2022, the National Post reported that an anonymous representative of the International Legion of Territorial Defence of Ukraine had confirmed 550 Canadians were currently in the Canadian Ukrainian Brigade fighting in Ukraine.  Belgian Minister of Defence Ludivine Dedonder confirmed on 15 March 2022 that one Belgian soldier had resigned to join the International Legion and another Belgian soldier had deserted to enlist in the International Legion.

Former New Zealander defense minister Ron Marks said that around 20 New Zealanders are fighting for the legion.

Structure and units
Some news reports have reported Mamuka Mamulashvili, commander of the Georgian Legion, is commanding all or part of the International Legion, but no official Ukrainian source has confirmed a commander.

List of units

The units and their respective nationalities have been reported as being part of the International Legion:

Other well-known military units composed by foreign nationals are the Belarusian Kastuś Kalinoŭski Regiment and the Chechen Sheikh Mansur Battalion. However, these are not part of the International Legion.

Special Forces Wing

A Special Forces wing, known as the Legionnaires Special Service Group (LSSG), is made of foreign fighters and was initiated by the Ukrainian Defense Ministry's intelligence directorate (GUR). This regiment is separate from the regular international legion, but recruits from the force.

The group has been successful in carrying out several attacks behind enemy lines. Operations use small groups, who go into and out of enemy territory clandestinely through jungle routes and seek their targets.

Summary of official international government responses

International response

Afghanistan
On May 2, 2022, there were reports of Afghan refugees with combat experience in the now disbanded Afghan special forces volunteering to fight with assistance from fellow Afghans who can speak Ukrainian and have settled in Ukraine permanently.

On March 10, 2023, most ex-Afghan soldiers trying to volunteer to Ukraine were being turned down out of concern that Wagner may use them to undermine the legion or may be trying to enter Ukraine as a way of traveling further to Europe to escape the Taliban.

Albania 
Mamuka Mamulashvili, a commander of foreign volunteers in Ukraine, said in an interview with Euronews Albania on 3 March 2022 that there were currently two Albanians in the International Legion. Mamulashvili also claimed they were waiting on the arrival of about 20–30 other Albanian volunteers who have applied to join the war in Ukraine.

Algeria 
In early March 2022, the Algerian government called on Ukraine to not enlist fighters from their country.

Argentina 
On 13 March 2022, the Ukrainian embassy in Buenos Aires posted on its social media to recruit Argentinian citizens who wanted to join the International Legion. On 22 March, it was reported that an unknown number of Argentinians have signed up to join.

Australia 
On 28 February 2022, when asked about Australians volunteering for Ukraine, the Prime Minister of Australia Scott Morrison told reporters "I would counsel against that purely for the safety of Australians that they would not travel to Ukraine," and "I would say at this time the legality of such actions are uncertain under Australian law."

As of 28 December 2022, four Australian volunteers were killed in Ukraine.

Austria 
Austrian law stipulates any citizen who enters into the military services of a foreign country has their citizenship revoked. In March 2022, Ministry of the Interior spokesman Harald Sörös confirmed that the government intends to prosecute any violators of the law. When asked whether the law would also be applied to Austrians providing only humanitarian assistance, Sörös responded it was "a matter for the courts to decide, not the executive." Austrian constitutional and administrative lawyer Heinz Mayer argued enforcement of the law could leave Austrians who attempt to join the International Legion or provide humanitarian assistance stateless.

Belarus 
On 9 March 2022, Euroradio.fm reported that Belarusians in Ukraine had formed the Kastuś Kalinoŭski Battalion with 200 volunteers, named after Kastuś Kalinoŭski. The battalion eventually grew to a regiment of over 1000 volunteers. It is not part of the International Legion in order to preserve greater autonomy.

On 30 March 2022, it was reported that more Belarusian volunteers will be assigned to another volunteer unit called the Pahonia Regiment.

Belgium 
In Belgian law, it is not illegal for a Belgian citizen to enlist for service in a foreign army. However, Time reported on 7 March 2022 that Belgium was dissuading its veterans from joining the International Legion. The first contingent of seven volunteers left Belgium for Ukraine on 4 March and included two Belgian Turks and a Belgian veteran of the Afghanistan War as well as Eastern European immigrants.

The Ukrainian embassy in Brussels confirmed on 15 March that 18 Belgian residents had arrived in Ukraine to enlist in the international legion while a further 92 had expressed interest in joining. Among those who had made contact with the Ukrainian Embassy were said to be Italian, French, Moroccan, and Luxembourg nationals. At least two members of the Belgian Land Component disobeyed orders to enlist with the International Legion.

It was subsequently reported that two Belgians had been immediately despatched to the front-line while the remainder had been concentrated at Yavoriv military base at the time of its bombing on 13 March. It was subsequently reported on 23 March that "more than half" of the 18 had returned to Belgium, either to convalesce after the Yavoriv bombing or as a result of dissatisfaction with their conditions of service. Concerns were raised about the personal backgrounds and political profile of some of the Belgian volunteers.

According to De Morgen, 14 Belgians travelled to fight in Ukraine between February and June 2022. By this date, nine had returned home and two had apparently been killed in action. One of the two was a 27-year old Belgian Ukrainian called Artem Dymyd from Charleroi who had enlisted in the Ukrainian Army in 2014 and who was killed by rocket fire in Donetsk.

Brazil 
As of 6 March, about 500 Brazilians are mobilizing on WhatsApp, Telegram and social networks groups to enlist. The Embassy of Ukraine in Brazil said that "it is not enlisting for the Ukrainian Foreign Legion" or "campaigning to join this military formation". The costs are up to US$1,5 thousand per person, including air tickets and documentation. There are over 600,000 people of Ukrainian descent living in Brazil.

As of July 6, three Brazilian volunteers were killed fighting in Ukraine. André Hack Bahi was killed on June 4 while helping fellow volunteers escape during fighting in the Luhansk region. Thalita do Valle, a female model and ex-Kurdish Pershmerga volunteer was killed in Kharkiv on June 30 during an attack on a Ukrainian bunker, which also resulted in the death of Douglas Búrigo when he tried to look for her since she didn't evacuate from the bunker in time. Brazilian diplomats confirmed the reports on July 5.

Bulgaria 
A Bulgarian citizen has declared he intends to go to Ukraine to join the International Legion, according to the Telegraph newspaper. The announcement was made on Twitter by his acquaintance. According to her, there are other compatriots who also intend to fight in the service of Ukraine.

On September 25, 2022, Bulgarian National Assembly candidate Ivan Kalchev has volunteered to participate with the legion in the Ukrainian counteroffensive.

Cambodia 
In early March 2022, Cambodian Prime Minister Hun Sen urged Cambodians not to travel to Ukraine and fight with Ukrainians in the legion.

Canada 
The 1937 Foreign Enlistment Act, enacted during the Spanish Civil War, prohibits Canadians from joining a foreign volunteer force against Canada's allies. In March 2022, Minister of National Defence Anita Anand noted that "the legalities of the situation are indeterminate at this time." The government had announced that it is up to individual Canadians to decide whether they want to join and that they "respect personal choices", though the government "is not facilitating" Canadians who are looking to join the International Legion.

Canada is home to the second-largest population of the Ukrainian diaspora after Russia. Due to a high number of Canadian volunteers, a separate Canadian battalion within the Legion, the Canadian Ukrainian Brigade, was established to avoid language barriers and logistics issues. In early March, it claimed that it has recruited at least 600 people.  A second formation of Canadian and British volunteers was formed under the name Norman Brigade. It is not part of Ukraine's official International Legion. A famous former Royal 22nd Regiment sniper nicknamed "Wali" from Montreal, called the deadliest sniper in the world after he reportedly eliminated 40 people a day as a sniper in Syria, Afghanistan and Iraq, also arrived in Ukraine to join the fight against Russia. He returned to his home country after two months.

Some of the soldiers in the Norman Brigade are concerned on whether the Norman Brigade's leader, nom de guerre Hrulf, is incompetent in managing the unit.

Chile 
Since early March 2022 there have been reports of volunteers trying to join the International Legion in Ukraine. TVN a Chilean public service broadcaster made an interview with one of the volunteers. Later in March various Chilean media spread the story of Luis Lagos, a former member of the Chilean national police force(Carabiniers of Chile) who joined the forces of Ukraine.

Colombia 
On 4 March 2022, Colombian newspaper El Espectador reported that at least 50 former Colombian soldiers will join the International Legion in Ukraine. El Espectador managed to get in touch with one of the former Colombian soldiers, identified as Camilo Sánchez, who said in the interview he and the group of ex-soldiers had contacted a Ukrainian military official to enlist.

On 23 July 2022, the first Colombian casualty was an ex-Colombian police officer named Christian Camilo Márquez was killed fighting in Izyum.

Croatia 
Croatian law penalizes organizing the departure or going to war in another country if it violates the constitutional order of that country, undermines the territorial integrity of the country and if the person is a mercenary.

Prior to the formation of International Legion, Balkan Insight reported that 20–30 Croatians joined the Ukrainian Azov Battalion to fight in the War in the Donbas in 2014–2015.

Post-formation 
On 27 February 2022, Croatian Prime Minister Andrej Plenković commented on news of the possible departure of Croatian volunteers to Ukraine after the announcement of the formation of the International Legion, saying "Every departure to Ukraine is an act of individuals and they take personal responsibility".

On 28 February, it was reported by Dnevnik.hr and Balkan Insight that Croatian fighters were already in Ukraine and more were intending to join them. Some volunteers cited Ukraine's quickness to recognize Croatia's independence in 1991 as a causus belli to join Ukraine.

The Croatian military envoy to Moscow Željko Akrap was summoned to the Russian Defense Ministry on 2 March 2022 and 3 March 2022 over allegations that 200 Croatian volunteers had joined the Ukrainian army. During the second call, the Russian side tried to hand over a protest note to Akrap but he refused to take it.

Cuba 
The Embassy of Ukraine in Havana attempted to recruit for the International Legion in March 2022.

Czech Republic 
Citizens of the Czech Republic are allowed to join other countries' armed forces as foreign volunteers if they get an approval by the President of the Czech Republic. On 28 February, the president Miloš Zeman stated he would be in favor of allowing potential volunteers to join the newly formed Ukrainian legion. The Ministry of Defence has already reported its first applicants.

It's reported that 600 Czechs have joined the legion as volunteers.

Denmark 
Prime Minister Mette Frederiksen said on 27 February 2022, that volunteering was "a choice anyone could make."

On 10 March, the Ukrainian Ambassador in Denmark reported that more than 100 Danes had volunteered.

On 7 April, an anonymous Danish volunteer soldier claimed to have killed 100 Russian soldiers during various operations.

On 26 April, a 25 year old was the first Dane to have been confirmed killed in combat.

Ecuador 
The Honorary Consul of Ukraine in Ecuador announced on 8 March 2022, that approximately 850 Ecuadorians had contacted the consulate and the Embassy of Ukraine in Lima attempting to volunteer with the International Legion.

Estonia 
The parliamentary groups of Estonia's Riigikogu are currently debating whether to allow Estonian citizens to volunteer to fight for Ukraine.

Minister of Justice Maris Lauri (Reform) said on Monday that Estonian law is unclear in regards to serving in a foreign military and whether doing so is punishable."Based on Estonian laws, nobody can be punished as soon as they go to serve a foreign country," Lauri said. "We don't have a single clause that states that a person should be punished or that they must for example be granted permission or that they must go through some kind of procedure in order to go volunteer."

The justice minister did note, however, that rules exist according to which if someone joins another country's military to fight, then they should inform the state and be granted specific permission to do so. Should anyone go fight on the Russian side, she added, then that is a punishable offense.

"If these are people who are residing in Estonia on the basis of a visa or residence permit, then they simply cannot come back here again," Lauri explained. "And if people come back who received [Estonian] citizenship via naturalization, then they may be stripped of their citizenship."

She added that anyone who has gone to fight who commits war crimes will likewise face punishment.

According to the minister, this matter is scheduled to be discussed at this week's government meeting as well.

On August 30, 2022, President Zelensky awarded German Barinov with the Order of Courage, 3rd Class.

Finland 
Finland's Ministry for Foreign Affairs has said that it has no information regarding how many people from Finland have left to join the fight in Ukraine. "The Foreign Ministry's travel bulletin recommends leaving Ukraine immediately. The ministry is highly limited in its ability to assist Finns in the war zone," ministry representatives told Yle in an email.

According to a report by Helsingin Sanomat, the Finnish Defence Forces do not recommend or advise Finns to apply to fight for a foreign cause.

France 
Hervé Grandjean, a spokesperson for France's Ministry for the Armed Forces, said individual volunteers could be "integrated in a body of Ukrainian volunteers" and "we cannot prevent them from leaving, (but) nor can we sanction that type of project." However, under French law, France can order a five-year jail term for "mercenaries" who are "specifically recruited to fight in an armed conflict," are neither "from a state involved in the armed conflict" or a "member of such state's military," and who are paid to "participate or try to participate in the hostilities."

A significant response has been reported in France to Zelenskyy's call for foreign fighters, with online interest estimated in the thousands, and some having already gone to Ukraine as of 3 March. The French Foreign Legion prevents current serving legionnaires from serving in Ukraine.

As of July 9, 2022, two French volunteers were killed in action.

Germany 
On 2 March, Minister of the Interior Nancy Faeser and Minister of Justice Marco Buschmann declared the Federal Government would not prevent its own citizens from going to Ukraine to fight in the war. These persons also would not face criminal prosecution. This applies to potential missions for both Ukrainians and Russians. The German Federal Police specified they would not let right-wing extremists travel to Ukraine.

Georgia 
On 28 February 50 Georgian volunteers arrived in Ukraine. "A group of Georgian volunteers arrived in Ukraine to help the wounded in Ukraine and, if necessary, to take part in hostilities. About 50 people managed to enter Ukraine by crossing the Sarpi customs point. They left for Ukraine on February 28."- Georgian Radio Free reported.

Due to Georgia already having had military conflicts with Russia in the 1992 Abkhazian War and 2008 War, many Georgians sympathized with Ukrainians and therefore went to help. Georgians and Ukrainians have a history of sending volunteers to each other's countries during times of conflict or helping each other in political and humanitarian matters during the aforementioned wars. Georgians have supported Ukraine since the start of the Russo-Ukrainian conflicts.
Ukraine has already established a battalion of Georgian fighters called the Georgian Legion since the War in Donbass, but new volunteers would be stationed in the newly formed International Legion of Territorial Defence of Ukraine.

On 1 March, a new batch of volunteers was to fly to Ukraine but the Georgian government canceled their flight. In response, Ukrainian President Volodymyr Zelensky denounced the Georgian government's "immoral position" and has recalled Ukraine's ambassador to Georgia.

Former Georgian Defense Minister, Irakli Okruashvili with some volunteers also traveled to Ukraine and joined the call to arms to defend Ukraine against Russia. His squad then joined the International Legion.

Greece 
The Ukrainian embassy in Athens, in early March 2022, received dozens of requests from Greek citizens and Ukrainian diaspora asking for information on how they could join the International Legion.

Hong Kong 
The participation of any Hong Konger in the international legion was first officially documented in a thank-you video posted on Twitter on 18 December 2022 by the Ukrainian Ministry of Defence. In that video, the Ukrainian military thanked the 20,000 volunteers from more than 50 countries. Before being deleted, the video featured the national flags of the home countries of the volunteers, including the Black Bauhinia flag of Hong Kong. The black flag is actually not the official flag of Hong Kong but a modified version that was widely used by pro-democracy protesters during the 2019–2020 Hong Kong protests. The gratitude video prompted strong criticism from the Chinese and Hong Kong governments.

Hungary 
Sky News reported at least one Hungarian, Akos Horvath, traveled to Ukraine to join the International Legion in March 2022.

India

Official stance 
The Ukrainian Embassy in India tweeted asking Indians to volunteer to fight for Ukraine in early March 2022, but it was later deleted after the Indian Ministry of External Affairs objected.
Indian domestic law clearly bars foreign fighters under Chapter VI, Section 121-130 of the Indian Penal Code. Foreign fighters can be sentenced to up to seven years upon return to India.

Foreign fighters

India 

Over 500 Indians from across the country, including some veterans have submitted applications volunteering to join the International Legion created to fight Russian forces in Ukraine.

However, only one 21-year-old Indian student in Kharkiv is known to have joined the Georgian National Legion in 2022. Later on, the student's family said that the student is willing to leave the Georgian National Legion and return to his home in India.

The first photo of International Legion distributed by Ukraine reportedly showed an Indian volunteer. The Indian volunteer reportedly shown in the photo is believed to be the 21-year-old student who had joined the Georgian National Legion earlier on.

Iran 
Sky News reported in early March 2022 that at least one Iranian had traveled to Ukraine to join the International Legion.

Iraq 
Oz Katerji, a freelance war correspondent based in Kyiv, tweeted on 1 March that "a group of  Kurds have joined the Ukrainian foreign legion" to fight against Russia.

Ireland 
Brendan Murphy, an Irish businessman fleeing Ukraine stated in an interview published 2 March 2022 that Irish people had already arrived in the country to fight with the International Legion. He said: "The first Irish veterans – they have to have military experience – arrived in Ukraine last night, which is good to see because they have the Irish tricolor on their arm".

Rory Mason was the first Irish volunteer killed in the Kharkiv region in late September or early October 2022.

Israel 
Ukrainian initiatives to recruit Israelis began on 26 February in tandem with thousands of Israelis protesting against the 2022 Russian invasion of Ukraine.

Many protesters had connections to Ukraine or other post-Soviet countries, but also a significant contingent of Israelis attended with no connection to the former USSR at all.

The Ukrainian Embassy focused on recruiting Israelis through its Facebook page.

By early March, it was reported that Israelis had been recruited and were heading to Ukraine. Most were veterans of the Israeli Defense Forces (IDF), and were primarily of Ukrainian, Russian, or other former USSR roots, but not exclusively so, with recruits of Druze Israeli and American-Israeli backgrounds also noted.

On 25 March, it was reported by the Israeli national newspaper Yedioth Ahronoth that a group of former IDF soldiers were training Ukrainian civilians; the ex-commando in charge stated to journalists that the program originated as a rescue mission for Ukraine's Jewish population but changed as the Ukrainian Jews required armed escorts and then military training. Yedioth Ahronoth reported that an unidentified Israeli official stated that the Israeli defense establishment was "looking the other way", in part because of the increasingly pro-Ukrainian sentiments and growing suspicion toward Russia, the official himself noting his own solidarity toward Ukraine in the face of "the worst kind of Russian aggression".

On 1 September 2022, Israeli citizen Dmitry Fialka was killed fighting in eastern Ukraine.

Italy 
Prior to the formation of the International Legion, about 50 to 60 Italian nationals travelled to Ukraine as foreign fighters before the 2022 Russian invasion of Ukraine. 25 to 30 supported Ukraine and 25 to 30 supported the Donbas separatists.

On March 2, 2022, the Ukraine Consulate in Milan posted on Facebook inviting Italians to join the International Legion, but the post was later deleted. Italian law does not forbid enlistment in a foreign army, although there are provisions banning the organisation of said enlistment, as well as mercenaries.

Giulia Schiff, an ex-Italian Air Force pilot, was reported to be in Kyiv after she enlisted with the legion's special forces unit.

On September 20, 2022, Benjamin Giorgio Galli, an Italian volunteer was killed in combat against Russian troops.

Japan 
On 1 March, Foreign Minister Yoshimasa Hayashi said, "I am aware that the Embassy of Ukraine in Japan is calling for such (volunteer soldiers), but I would like you to refrain from traveling to Ukraine, regardless of your purpose."

As of 2 March 2022, 70 Japanese men have applied to be volunteers of the volunteer foreign legion. Of these, 50 are former members of the Japan Self-Defense Forces and two are former members of the French Foreign Legion. It was reported that an unnamed company in Tokyo assisted the Embassy in recruiting potential candidates.

According to lawyers interviewed, a Japanese person who works under a foreign military to wage war against another country could potentially be charged under Article 93 of the Penal Code. The law, however, has only been used against Japanese nationals who were arrested for plans to work under ISIL.

On 16 March, CNN Turkey reported that three Japanese nationals with military experience were allowed to enter Ukraine. On November 7, Asahi Shimbun interviewed an anonymous Japanese volunteer who joined the legion with minimal military experience.

On 11 August, Russian Defense Ministry reports claim that nine Japanese nationals are in the legion while one left Ukraine.

On 11 November, Tokyo has confirmed that a Japanese volunteer was killed fighting Russian troops, in only days after mourning his Taiwanese comrade's death in the Luhansk front.

Kosovo 
Kosovar law bars participation in foreign armed groups. Despite this two Kosovar citizens reportedly travelled to join the International Legion in early March 2022.

Several members of the Kosovar diaspora in Switzerland reportedly contacted the embassy in Bern in early March 2022 to join the International Legion.

Latvia 
The Saeima of Latvia unanimously approved immunity from prosecution for Latvian volunteers who wish to join combat on the side of the Ukrainian military.

On 8 March 2022, member of the Saeima  of the New Conservative Party volunteered to fight with fellow Latvians in Ukraine.

Lithuania 
On 7 March 2022, Time reported an estimated 200 Lithuanians have registered to fight with the Ukrainian embassy.

The first photo of International Legion distributed by Ukraine reportedly showed Lithuanian volunteers.

Malaysia 
In late February 2022, The Star reported that two Malaysians joined the Territorial Defense Army in Kyiv.

Mexico 
In early March 2022, the State Service of Special Communications and Information Protection of Ukraine reported Mexican volunteers had joined the International Legion in defense of Kyiv.

The first photo distributed by Ukraine of the International Legion reportedly showed Mexican volunteers.

Moldova 
The Prime Minister of Moldova, Natalia Gavrilița, was asked during a press conference on 28 February 2022 whether citizens of Moldova can join the International Legion. She responded "We are a neutral country and we will act in the light of neutrality. The Government of the Republic of Moldova is not involved in such actions."

By April 2022 dozens of Moldovan citizens were fighting in Ukraine against the Russian occupiers, most of them enlisted in the Ukrainian army in the first few days of the war.

In a statement made by a group of Moldovans fighting on the front in Ukraine, in November 2022, the number is more then 300 Moldovan citizens in the International Legion.

Montenegro 
In March 2022, the Democratic Front urged the Montenegrin authorities to take action to stop the recruitment of volunteer fighters for the war in Ukraine, after the Ukrainian Embassy in Podgorica posted on Facebook calling for foreign volunteers for the International Legion. Montenegrin law criminalizes participation in foreign conflicts and those convicted face prison sentences of up to ten years.

Netherlands 
Minister of Defence Kajsa Ollongren advised Dutch nationals not to travel to Ukraine saying "The country's travel advice is red. It is extremely dangerous." Additionally, Dutch military code bars active Dutch soldiers from joining a foreign army and Dutch law bars civilians from enlisting in an enemy army in a war in which the Netherlands participates. However, it may be legal for Dutch civilians to join the International Legion.

On 4 March 2022, the Ukrainian embassy in the Hague declined to comment on the number of Dutch volunteers.  As of 7 March 2022, it is estimated around 200 Dutchmen have attempted to join the legion at the Ukrainian embassy in The Hague. According to the Ukrainian embassy's national coordinator for the International Legion, Gert Snitselaar, 40 volunteers have departed the Netherlands for Ukraine.

There have already been reports of some Dutch casualties in the fighting around Lviv and Kyiv. Gert Snitselaar states: "I was in contact with a few (volunteers) this morning, but since then there has been no communication," In response to the bombing of Lviv. He is certain Dutch citizens have perished during the fighting. However, no indication of the number of casualties has been given.

The first official Dutch casualty of the war perished on May 4, 2022. On September 20, 2022, it was reported that another Dutch volunteer was killed in Kharkiv.

New Zealand 
New Zealand officially has a "do not travel" warning issued for Ukraine and the Ukrainian consul in Auckland, Oleksandr Kirichuk, says he cannot assist New Zealanders in travelling to Ukraine. Despite this he says over 500 New Zealanders have attempted to volunteer to fight in Ukraine against Russia.

The New Zealand Herald reported on an ex-British Army/New Zealand Army veteran (and PR citizen) recruited to the legion, though the unnamed veteran said that he will use his British passport to travel.

On August 25, 2022, Dominic Abelen was reported as the first New Zealand volunteer to be killed in action in the legion, who joined while on leave from the New Zealand military. It was further reported that Abelen was recruited to the LSSG. On February 4, 2023, it's reported that Abelen may have been shot and killed in a friendly fire incident.

Nigeria 
On 7 March 2022, Nigeria's Ministry of Foreign Affairs declared that Nigerian citizens are not allowed to serve as mercenaries or foreign volunteers for Ukraine. It has been reported that an unknown number of Nigerians wish to join the legion in Ukraine.

In a BBC Focus Africa program, Russian Ministry of Defense officials claimed that 38 Nigerians were killed while under Ukrainian command.

North Macedonia 
On 8 March 2022 the Ukrainian Embassy posted an appeal on social media for volunteers to join the International legion. However, North Macedonian law bars joining foreign armies.  There have been no reported cases of North Macedonian citizens going to Ukraine to join the International Legion.

Norway 
On 7 March 2022, Time reported the Ukrainian embassy in Norway estimated 300 Norwegian nationals had signed up to volunteer at their embassy.

As of 8 April 2022, Sandra Andersen Eira, an ex-politician from the Sámi Parliament of Norway, volunteered to work in the legion as a medic.

Peru 
A Peruvian former soldier discharged from the Peruvian army, César Eduardo Pérez Farfán, is reported to have traveled to Ukraine to join the International legion.

Poland 
Polish citizens may join the army of foreign countries only after approval of a written application by the Polish Ministry of National Defense. There are several formal conditions that must be met in order to issue a permit. Among others, one cannot currently be in active military service and joining the army of a foreign country cannot violate the interests of the Republic of Poland. A group of at least 30 people in Poland who were willing to join the International Legion have reportedly organized to begin training.

Portugal 
The Government of Ukraine stated on 4 March 2022 that "some Portuguese" were already fighting in the International Legion of Territorial Defence. Sniper unit former Ranger force COE. Vitaliy Mukhin, spokesman for the Government, did not specify the concrete number of Portuguese who are already in Ukrainian territory.

Romania 
Dozens of Romanians sent messages to the Ukrainian embassy in Bucharest to be accepted into the International Legion.

Russia 
Ukraine has said some former Russian soldiers have switched sides and have now joined Kyiv's forces. The Ukrainian defense ministry said on its Telegram channel on March 30 that commanders of the Freedom of Russia Legion were visiting detained former Russian military personnel "in order to select those who wish to serve."

On 3 March 2022, Russian Defense Ministry spokesman Igor Konashenkov warned that foreign fighters would be treated as unlawful combatants entitled to no protection under the Geneva Conventions, meaning captured foreign fighters will not be given prisoner of war status and will be prosecuted as mercenaries.

Senegal 
On 3 March, Senegal's foreign ministry condemned a social media post by the country's Ukrainian embassy calling for volunteers as illegal under Senegalese law. The Ukrainian ambassador to Senegal was summoned and asked to take down the post.

It was reported that 36 Senegalese nationals attempted to volunteer at the Ukrainian embassy in Dakar.

In a BBC Focus Africa program on June 23, 2022, Russian Ministry of Defense officials claimed that four Senegalese volunteers were killed while under Ukrainian command.

Serbia 
Serbian law bars its nationals from participation in foreign conflicts. In March 2022, Serbian president Aleksandar Vučić said "As for volunteers, since both sides have called for volunteers, the Serbian criminal code – and we will amend it to be stricter – outlaws participation in any conflicts that do not defend Serbia's territorial integrity," and "Any of those who think they should take part in some war, we will punish severely in accordance with our constitution and our laws."

Nevertheless, a spokesman for the International Legion confirmed that there indeed are a number of Serb fighters in the legion and that they are fighting alongside fighters from neighboring countries.

Singapore 
Vivian Balakrishnan, Singaporean Minister of Foreign Affairs, said during a Parliament session on 22 February that Singaporeans must only fight for Singaporean national security interests and not fight in other places even for noble reasons.

The Singaporean Ministry of Home Affairs has stated that Singaporeans who are in Ukraine are potentially liable for any criminal offences committed outside Singapore, especially when fighting Russian-backed forces, with offenders liable for imprisonment from 15 years to life with fines included.

Slovakia 
Some Slovakian citizens have indicated they want to go fight in the International Legion, according to Minister of Defense Jaroslav Naď. However, it is illegal for Slovakian citizens to join a foreign army without a permit from the Slovakian government.

South Africa 
It is unclear whether volunteering for foreign military service is illegal under South African law. The 1998 Regulation of Foreign Military Assistance Act was passed to "regulate the rendering of foreign military assistance" by South Africans, but was largely referred to as a "mercenary bill" targeting former apartheid soldiers working as mercenaries. The 2006 Prohibition of Mercenary Activities and Regulation of Certain Activities in Country of Armed Conflict Act amended the bill, but appears to have never been enforced.

On 11 March 2022, Ukraine's ambassador to South Africa, Liubov Abravitova, announced she is waiting on a legal ruling from the Department of International Relations and Cooperation on whether or not Ukraine may actively recruit South Africans to join the International Legion. Abravitova told the Cape Town Press Club, on 11 March, that anyone who wanted to join Ukraine's fight against Russia was welcome. She added that Ukrainian President Volodymyr Zelensky's idea was not new since France already had a foreign legion.
She also said the embassy in Pretoria had received hundreds of requests to volunteer from people from across the region, including Madagascar, Mauritius, Zimbabwe, Namibia, Zambia, and Botswana.

The National Post reported that at least one South African national was recruited into the Norman Brigade.

South Korea 
On 7 March 2022, the Ukrainian Embassy in Seoul reported it had received some 100 applications from South Korean volunteers. Various news sources claim a well-known South Korean Navy SEAL team is already in Ukraine fighting, which includes YouTube/TV celebrity Ken Rhee. The Ukrainian Embassy declined to verify the number of South Korean volunteer soldiers who have departed for Ukraine, citing "security reasons".

The Republic of Korea Marine Corps reported on 22 March 2022 that a Marine from the 1st Marine Division deserted from his unit and traveled to Ukraine to fight with the Legion. State Border Guard Service of Ukraine guards prohibited him from entering after Seoul passed information about him going AWOL before crossing the Polish-Ukrainian border. On 28 March, it was reported the deserter evaded being arrested and was on his way to join the legion.

Damien Magrou reported to South Korean media on 28 March that South Korean volunteers are already deployed and fighting Russian troops.

On 30 March, Ken Rhee mentioned that he's involved in creating volunteer-based special forces units in cooperation with the Ukrainian military. In May 2022, Rhee has been deployed in various special forces operations, working with other volunteers with special forces background with the Ukrainian Spetsnaz. On May 20, Rhee was reported to be injured in the field, but is expected to make a recovery when he goes back to South Korea. Rhee mentioned that he's willing to be investigated by the police over his presence in Ukraine and has politely turned down Ukrainian nationality. The Seoul Metropolitan Police Agency is in the process of adding his name to a no-fly list.

On June 18, 2022, the South Korean government is checking claims that four South Korean nationals are killed in action fighting with the legion. The report also mentioned that 13 South Koreans are working in the legion.

On February 23, 2023, anonymous South Korean volunteers were interviewed, including a volunteer named Kim who used to be a commando with the Republic of Korea Army Special Warfare Command and last worked under the NIS for nine years before he went to Ukraine.

Spain 
On 7 March 2022, Time reported Spanish nationals had enlisted at the Ukrainian consulate in Barcelona.

Sri Lanka
As of July 2022, an ex-Sri Lankan commando known as “Dentist” has been deployed to the field in Kharkiv.

Sweden 
Very shortly after the appeal for volunteers several hundreds of Swedish military volunteers enlisted in the International Legion for Ukraine, according to the Swedish newspaper Svenska Dagbladet. On 25 March 2022, TT News Agency reported that 678 Swedes were already on the ground fighting the Russian forces in Ukraine.

The first photo distributed by Ukraine of the International Legion reportedly showed Swedish volunteers.

Switzerland 
In early March, 35 people contacted the Ukrainian Embassy in Bern to join the international legion, according to Radio Télévision Suisse. Among these volunteers, three people are of Swiss nationality.

According to Article 94 of the Swiss Military Penal Code, such service is prohibited for Swiss without permission of the Federal Council, under penalty of a fine or imprisonment for a maximum of three years.

On May 5, 2022, a Swiss national and two French nationals were reported to be traveling to Ukraine to join the legion.

Syria 
Some members of groups opposing Bashar al-Assad in the Syrian Civil War have attempted to travel to Ukraine, motivated by Russia's support of the Assad regime.

Taiwan 
Taiwan's Ministry of Foreign Affairs responded a question in a press conference regarding the official stance towards any Taiwanese national who wants to join the International Legion in the war of Ukraine, stated "the government's consistent position is to call on all Taiwanese nationals to avoid traveling to Ukraine, due to the deteriorating situation in there." "The government fully understands the sentiment of its nationals who want to stand for righteousness and give their support to Ukraine. However, on the standpoint of protecting the safety of its people and the risk of war, the government advises its nationals to avoid going there." and reiterated "in order to urge Russia to stop its military aggression against Ukraine, Taiwan will participate in the economic sanctions imposed on Russia along with the international community."

Due to the lack of formal diplomatic relations between Ukraine and Taiwan, no diplomatic missions were established in either side. The Representative Office of Poland in Taipei suggested that the Taiwanese volunteers first need to travel to Poland, and enlist with the Ukrainian Embassy in Warsaw, but the Polish Office in Taipei declined to comment when the press tried to verify, neither confirm nor deny that such information is held.

On 22 March, a Taiwanese Amis volunteer named Wang Jui-ti traveled to Helsinki to hand his application to join the Legion. On 29 March, he said that the application was not successful because the legion changed its requirements for volunteers to have military experience with combat exposure. However, he was advised by Ukrainian embassy staff in Vilnus, Lithuania to instead help the refugees in Poland.

On 10 April, it was reported that a Taiwanese man named Wang Nan-ying (known as Naive Wang), who lived in Kharkiv for eight years, enlisted in the legion after the war started while helping refugees in Poland. He is fluent in Ukrainian and Russian aside from English, Japanese and Mandarin.

On 13 May, an ex-Taiwanese marine is reported to have been recruited in the legion and is deployed in Eastern Ukraine.

As of 3 July, around 10 Taiwanese nationals were recruited to the legion.

On 2 November, a 25-year-old Taiwanese indigenous veteran Tseng, Sheng-guang serving in Carpathian Sich Battalion, was reported as the first East Asian soldier killed in action in the war, after covering 3 colleagues to retreat under a tank siege during the eastern Ukraine campaign in Luhansk Oblast.

Thailand 
The Thai government stated that there is no law that bans Thai citizens from volunteering to fight in foreign legions, but they should "consider the potential grave danger as Russian forces pound Ukrainian cities with heavy weapons."

Over 2,000 pro-democracy activists in Thailand have attempted to sign up to join the International Legion. However the Ukrainian embassy in Bangkok did not confirm how many had successfully volunteered for the International Legion.

On 18 March 2022, Ukrainian chargé d'affaires Oleksandr Lysak spoke to Thai-based reporters in Bangkok and told them that the Ukrainian military has not recruited any Thais to work in the legion.

Turkey 
Turkey does not have a law that bars foreign fighters, but frequently prosecutes them upon return to Turkey for violating criminal or anti-terror laws. The Turkish authorities have not commented on Turkish citizens joining the war in Ukraine.

Turkish news reports have confirmed some Turkish citizens and members of the Turkish diaspora had attempted to join the International legion. Some Turkish nationals in Ukraine have been turned away from the International Legion.

A Turkish citizen who has been living in Ukraine said he had signed up for the foreign legion along with 6 other Turkish citizens but they were later rejected. He claimed that the Turkish authorities had asked Ukraine not to accept any Turkish citizens into its Foreign Legion.

United Kingdom 
Liz Truss, then Foreign Secretary of the United Kingdom said "the people of Ukraine are fighting for freedom and democracy, not just for Ukraine but also for the whole of Europe because that is what President Vladimir Putin is challenging. And absolutely, if people want to support that struggle, I would support them in doing that." However, then prime minister Boris Johnson's office did not endorse Truss's statement. The statement was also criticized by several politicians who said volunteers may be in violation of the Foreign Enlistment Act 1870. It has been reported those who travel to Ukraine may be acting in contravention of UK anti-terrorism laws, though legal experts said prosecution would be unlikely owing to the UK government's support for Ukraine's armed resistance.

Ukrainian sources said 6,000 Britons had registered an interest in joining. The Times reported that over 150 former paratroopers who served in the War in Afghanistan had joined and were travelling to the front line. UK military officials instructed regular and reserve personnel not to travel to Ukraine.

On 9 March, a 19-year old Coldstream Guard soldier left his barracks at Windsor and traveled to Poland in order to enlist with the legion. He was detained upon his return to the UK on 21 March.

The first photo distributed by Ukraine of the International Legion reportedly showed volunteers from the United Kingdom.

On August 15, 2022, three captured British citizens, two International Legion volunteers and an aid worker, pleaded not guilty to charges of fighting as mercenaries in a court in the Donetsk People's Republic. The same court had previously passed death sentences on two British members of regular Ukrainian units, under the same charges.

In September 2022, five British nationals, including two who were sentenced to death, were freed from Russian captivity in a prisoner swap with Ukrainian forces. Aiden Aslin, John Harding, Dylan Healy, Andrew Hill and Shaun Pinner all returned home to the UK.

As of January 2023, seven British volunteer fighters and aid workers were known to be killed in Ukraine. Scott Sibley was killed on April 22, 2022, during fighting in Mykolaiv from mortar bombardment while 19-year-old Jordan Gatley was killed in fighting against Russian troops in Severodonetsk alongside Ukrainian troops. Craig Mackintosh was killed on August 24, 2022 while working as a volunteer medic. Ex-Army reservist and dual Ukrainian-British national Viktor Yatsunyk was killed by a landmine in Izium. Simon Lingard died of shrapnel wounds after his unit came under attack from Russian forces. Chris Parry and Andrew Bagshaw were killed whilst attempting an humanitarian evacuation of civilians in eastern Ukraine.

United States 
The United States Department of State issued a travel advisory formally advising all Americans not to travel to Ukraine.  The Neutrality Act of 1794, a federal law whose provisions remains in effect as of March 2022, prohibits United States citizens from taking up arms while on US territory against any country at peace with the United States. It is unclear whether the United States Congress will pass legislation to waive this restriction with respect to the conflict in Ukraine.

On 3 March 2022, the Ukrainian embassy in Washington, DC announced that 3,000 US citizens had signed up to volunteer. By 10 March 2022, the embassy had announced that 6,000 United States citizens had attempted to sign up for the International Legion. However, as of 10 March, only 100 were approved to join.

The first photo distributed by Ukraine of the International Legion reportedly showed American volunteers.

Uruguay
On February 1, 2023, an Uruguayan volunteer codenamed Teddy was reported to be fighting in Ukraine since February 24, 2022.

Venezuela
In the Ukrainian capital, a Venezuelan man and his wife joined the International Legion to fight for the country after the Russian invasion.

José David Chaparro, a Venezuelan from San Cristóbal who settled in Kyiv in the early 90s and served as Venezuela's chargé d'affaires in Moscow between 2001 and 2005, enlisted in the Territorial Defense Forces in the second day of the invasion and became the commander of a division of Ukrainian volunteers. Chaparro's unit has helped donating food, water, commodities and fuel to civilians affected by Russian bombings.

Vietnam 
Under Article 425 of the Vietnamese Criminal Code, it states that anyone who fights as a mercenary to fight against another country will be imprisoned from 5 to 15 years. Despite this, an unknown number of Vietnamese military veterans have expressed their desire to help the Ukrainians.

Notable individuals who enlisted 

 Sandra Andersen Eira, Norwegian Sámi politician and former member of the Sámi Parliament of Norway
 Aleko Elisashvili, a member of the Parliament of Georgia
 , a member of the Latvian Saeima
 , South Korean YouTuber and former South Korean Navy SWF officer
 Conor R. Kennedy, grandson of former United States Attorney General Robert F. Kennedy and great-nephew of former President of the United States John F. Kennedy
 Mamuka Mamulashvili, commander of the Georgian Legion
 Malcolm Nance, American author, retired U.S. Navy senior chief petty officer, founder of think tank Terror Asymmetrics Project on Strategy, Tactics and Radical Ideologies
 Irakli Okruashvili, a Georgian politician and former defense minister
  (Irgen Gioro.Chi Wei), a Chinese dissident and whistleblower
 , chairman of the Young Front
 Igor Volobuev, former vice-president of Gazprombank who left Russia at the start of war and joined the Freedom of Russia Legion.
 José David Chaparro, ex-Chargé d'Affaires of Venezuela in Moscow from 2001 to 2005.
 Tseng Sheng-guang, a Taiwanese indigenous veteran used to serve as Republic of China Army corporal and join the International legion in June 2022, he was often reported as the first soldier from the East Asia to be killed in action during the Russo-Ukrainian War.

Casualties 
Some casualties have been officially reported. However, there is no way to determine the exact number of casualties due to the fog of war. In the most notable episode, on 13 March, Russian missiles struck Yavoriv military base near the Polish border, killing 35 people and injuring 134 people, according to Ukrainian officials.  As many as 1,000 foreign fighters had been training at the base as part of the Ukrainian Foreign Legion. 

According to an interview with a former German volunteer, around 800 to 1,000 people were at the base at the time of the Russian attack, of whom 100 were presumed dead.

Controversies

According to The Kyiv Independent, which has received informations from sources inside the Legion, the leadership of the intelligence-run wing of the International Legion is allegedly implicated in various violations, including abuse, theft, and sending soldiers unprepared on reckless missions. The paper also claims that one of the unit's commanders is an alleged former member of a criminal organization from Poland, wanted at home for fraud: the Legion's fighters accuse him of abusing power by ordering soldiers to loot shops, threatening soldiers with a gun, and sexually harassing the legion's female medics.

Members of the Legion, according to The Kyiv Independent, repeatedly reported this to the Ministry of Internal Affairs, the Ministry of Defence, the Verkhovna Rada and the Office of the President of Ukraine, but received no proper answer.

See also 
 Foreign fighters in the Russo-Ukrainian War
 List of military legions
 List of foreign volunteers

Notes

References

External links

 fightforua.org 
 "Want to go fight for Ukraine? Here's what to do." by Howard Altman

 
2022 establishments in Ukraine
Military units and formations established in 2022
Foreign volunteer units resisting the 2022 Russian invasion of Ukraine
Ground Forces of Ukraine
Ukrainian military personnel
Ukrainian diaspora
Expatriates in Ukraine
Territorial defence battalions of Ukraine
Military units and formations of the 2022 Russian invasion of Ukraine